The Karnataka State Film Award for Director's First Time Best Film is a state film award of the Indian state of Karnataka  given during the annual Karnataka State Film Awards. The award honors new debutant directors.

Winners

References

Karnataka State Film Awards
2011 establishments in Karnataka
Directorial debut film awards